Vancouver 2010 is the official Olympic video game of the 2010 Winter Olympics held in Vancouver, British Columbia, Canada. It was developed by Eurocom (who had worked on previous Olympic games in 2004 and 2008), and published by Sega.

Gameplay
Vancouver 2010 is a video game based on the Vancouver 2010 Winter Olympic Games. Many of the events in the real-world Olympics are playable.

Disciplines
The following events are in the game:

In addition, the game includes 30 different challenges spread over all the events which can be unlocked on a one-by-one basis as the user completes the tasks (For example, the 'Landing Zone' challenge forces the individual to land a ski jump with 10m of 90m and another successive jump within 10m of 120m).

Playable nations

There is a total of 24 playable countries in the game. They are:

Reception

Vancouver 2010 received "mixed" reviews on all platforms according to the review aggregation website Metacritic. IGN said of the PlayStation 3 and Xbox 360 versions: "If only this game had some semblance of a career mode or anything that felt slightly like the real Olympics, then perhaps SEGA would have had a real winner on its hands". GameSpot said of the same console versions: "The limited selection of events leaves these Olympic Games out in the cold".

See also
 Olympic video games
 2010 Winter Olympics
 Mario & Sonic at the Olympic Winter Games

References

External links
 Olympic Video games microsite
 
 

2010 video games
2010 Winter Olympics
Eurocom games
Games for Windows certified games
IOS games
Multiplayer and single-player video games
PlayStation 3 games
Sega video games
Sports video games set in Canada
Video games developed in the United Kingdom
Video games set in 2010
Video games set in Vancouver
Windows games
Winter Olympic video games
Xbox 360 games